Gonets (Russian Гонец, for Messenger) is a Russian civilian low Earth orbit communications satellite system. It consists of a number of satellites, derived from Strela military communications satellites. The first two satellites, which were used to test and validate the system, were launched by a Tsyklon-3 launch vehicle from the Plesetsk Cosmodrome on 13 July 1992, and were designated Gonets-D. The first operational satellites, designated Gonets-D1, were launched on 19 February 1996. After launch, the first three satellites were given military Kosmos designations, a practice which was not continued with the other satellites.

Ten operational satellites and two demonstration spacecraft have been placed in orbit. A further three were lost in a launch failure on 27 December 2000. A new series of modernised Gonets satellites, Gonets-D1M, supplement and replace the satellites which are currently in orbit. A single first D1M satellite was launched by a Kosmos-3M launch vehicle on 21 December 2005. A second Gonets-D1M satellite was launched by a Rokot launch vehicle on 8 September 2010.

Operator 
Gonets satellites are operated along with the third generation Luch satellites by Gonets Satellite System company. Gonets was originally a Roscosmos programme, but in 1996 it was privatised and operated by Gonets Satellite System, which was controlled by ISS Reshetnev. In 2017, Roscosmos acquired 80% of Gonets SatCom from ISS Reshetnev. The remaining 20% were held by Dauria Satcom. By 2018, Dauria Satcom sold the shares to Business-Sfera of Coalco group while Roscosmos sold 29% to other private investors. Gonets SatCom has become a Russian space industry company with the largest (49%) share of private capital.

User characteristics 
, the Gonets orbit group comprises 25 second-generation spacecraft "Gonets-M" and 1 first-generation "Gonets-D1". The orbital group performs the task of direct communication with subscribers at any point of the globe. With such a number of spacecraft in the Gonets orbit group, the system provides communication with waiting time characteristics as indicated in the following table. The next 3 Gonets-M satellites will be launched in 2022 by an Angara-1.2 launcher from the Plesetsk cosmodrome.

Technical characteristics of subscriber terminals 0.3–0.4 GHz

See also 

 Iridium
 Globalstar
 Orbcomm

References

External links 
 Gonets SatCom website (Russian)
 in English

Soviet and Russian space institutions
Communications satellites
Communications satellite operators
Communications satellites of Russia
Communications satellites in low Earth orbit
Satellite constellations